Ctenophryne is a genus of microhylid frogs. They occur in southern Central America (Costa Rica, Panama) and South America. Their common names are egg frogs and Nelson frogs, the latter applying to species in the formerly recognized Nelsonophryne.

Taxonomy and systematics
As of 2017, Ctenophryne includes two other genera, Nelsonophryne and Melanophryne, in synonymy. The latter might represent valid genera, but molecular analyses could not resolve their relationships in a robust way. Placing Nelsonophryne and Melanophryne in the synonymy of Ctenophryne is an interim measure that avoids paraphyly, until new data might resolve the relationships. When Ctenophryne is defined this way, it is a monophyletic group that is the sister group to all
other gastrophrynines.

Description
Ctenophryne range from relatively small Ctenophryne barbatula (female size  in snout–vent length) to moderately large Ctenophryne aterrima (female size to ). The current definition of the genus is essentially based on molecular phylogenetics rather than morphology.

Species
There are six species:
 Ctenophryne aequatorialis (Peracca, 1904)
 Ctenophryne aterrima (Günther, 1901)
 Ctenophryne barbatula (Lehr and Trueb, 2007)
 Ctenophryne carpish (Lehr, Rodriguez, and Córdova, 2002)
 Ctenophryne geayi Mocquard, 1904
 Ctenophryne minor Zweifel and Myers, 1989

References

 
Microhylidae
Amphibian genera
Amphibians of Central America
Amphibians of South America
Taxa named by François Mocquard